Marseille-Blancarde station (French: Gare de Marseille-Blancarde) is a French railway station located in the city of Marseille (district of La Blancarde), in the Bouches-du-Rhône department in the Provence-Alpes-Côte d'Azur region. It is also a station on Line 1 of the Marseille Metro.

Located on the tripoint border between the 4th, 5th and 12th arrondissement of Marseille, it is owned by France's national state-owned railway company SNCF and served by TER Provence-Alpes-Côte-d'Azur regional trains. According to the SNCF, 424,347 passengers travelled through the station in 2018.

History
The train station was the stopping point of some Marseille trains linking Paris to the Côte d'Azur (the Paris-Côte d'Azur and the Blue Train in particular), which avoided the creep in the Gare de Marseille-Saint-Charles by using the Chartreux connection (service restored at the end of 2015). The existence of a tram line (old Line 68; current Line 1) linking the Blancarde station in the heart of the city by the Chave boulevard and the tunnel under the Plain facilitated its use. The removal of this has considerably diminished the importance of this station.

From 2009, the station was the subject of improvement works in the redevelopment of the line between Blancarde and Aubagne. Signaling work is being done around the station to modernise the infrastructure on the route leading to the Gare de Marseille-Saint-Charles. Most of the civil engineering work in this area is concentrated upstream between the station and that of La Pomme.

Train services 
 Night services Paris - Marseille - Nice
 Regional services (TER Provence-Alpes-Côte-d'Azur 1) Marseille ... Toulon ... Hyères

References

4th arrondissement of Marseille
5th arrondissement of Marseille
Buildings and structures in Marseille
Railway stations in Marseille